Del Gallego, officially the Municipality of Del Gallego, is a 4th class municipality in the province of Camarines Sur, Philippines. According to the 2020 census, it has a population of 26,403 people.

It used to be called Danawin and is located along Quilbay River. It was established through Executive Order No. 56 Series of 1936 signed by then President Manuel L. Quezon.

The municipality celebrated its 80th foundation anniversary on October 5, 2017.

Del Gallego is the last town in the northern part of Camarines Sur. This is where the Quirino Highway (Andaya Highway) road meets with the first town of Quezon, Tagkawayan.

According to the town's socio-economic profile in the year 1998, agricultural workers are greater in number reaching about 70% of the whole working force while the remaining 30% are engaged in non-agricultural occupations.

History
In 1959, the following sitios were converted into barrios: Sinuknipan, Sabang, Pasay and Bajo (renamed to San Juan).

Geography

Barangays

Del Gallego is politically subdivided into 32 barangays.

Climate

Demographics

Economy 

The Del Gallego Town Proper is strategic for fishing and farming. There are many businesses (local and international) in the Municipal Proper. Del Gallego has a port and operates daily to the Bondoc Peninsula and Batangas.

The Municipal Government is successfully improving the town and the towns people's lives.

Also due to its location between two Major town centers Sipocot and Tagkawayan it now serves as a rest stop.

• 1/3 of people rely on Agriculture

• 1/4 of people rely on fishing

• There are restaurants and several gas stations in the town

• There are hotels in and near the town

• It is more dependent on Tagkawayan for some market needs instead of Sipocot or Naga City

• Market days are usually on Mondays Wednesdays and Fridays and the market is least busy during Sundays.

• 94% of people have access to electricity

• People sell wood

• 89% of people have access to clean and potable water

• Its electricity is powered and supplied by Quezelco.

Transportation

The municipality is connected with Manila by the Andaya Highway and daily rail services to and from Naga & Legazpi are provided by the Philippine National Railways.

In order to spur development in the municipality, The Toll Regulatory Board declared Toll Road 5 the extension of South Luzon Expressway. A 420-kilometer, four lane expressway starting from the terminal point of the now under construction SLEX Toll Road 4 at Barangay Mayao, Lucena City in Quezon to Matnog, Sorsogon, near the Matnog Ferry Terminal. On August 25, 2020, San Miguel Corporation announced that they will invest the project which will reduce travel time from Lucena to Matnog from 9 hours to 5.5 hours.

Another expressway that will serve Del Gallego is the Quezon-Bicol Expressway (QuBEx), which will link between Lucena and San Fernando, Camarines Sur.

Education
Del Gallego has a total of thirteen (13) schools, eleven of which are public schools and the other two are private schools.

Public Schools:
 Bagong Silang Integrated School
 Cabasag Elementary School
 Del Gallego Central School
 Del Gallego National High School
 Kinalangan Elementary School
 Magais Elementary School
 Mansalaya Elementary School
 Mansalaya National High School
 Sabang Elementary School
 Sinuknipan Elementary School
 Sinuknipan National High School
 Tabion Elementary School

Private Schools:
 Alfelor Sr. Memorial College
 Colegio de Sta. Rita (Cam. Sur) Foundation, Inc.

Gallery

References

External links
 [ Philippine Standard Geographic Code]
Philippine Census Information
Official Site of the Province of Camarines Sur

Municipalities of Camarines Sur
Establishments by Philippine executive order